Utz is a name. Notable people with the name include:
surname
Carolyn Utz (1913-2005), American bassist, educator and conductor
David Utz (1923–2011), American surgeon
Harley (1898-2001) and Sylvia Utz (1899-2009), American couple married for 83 years
Lois Utz (1932–86), American children's literature author
Richard Utz (born 1961), scholar of medieval studies
Stanley Frederick Utz (1898–1974), Australian businessman and politician
Willibald Utz (1893–1954), German officer in the World War II Wehrmacht (Generalleutnant)
Lorna Utz, an Australian tennis player

given name
Utz Chwalla (born 1942), Austrian bobsledder
Utz Claassen (born 1963), German manager, entrepreneur and author
Utz Rothe (born 1941), Austrian painter and graphic artist

nickname
Irwin Uteritz, (1899–1963), American athlete and coach who changed his surname to Utz in 1952 - it having been his nickname
Wilhelm "Utz" Utermann (1912–1991), German writer and film producer

Surnames from given names